Seyyed Sohrab (also Romanized as Seyyed Sohrāb; also known as Saiyid Fatu, Sayid Fata, and Seyyed Fotūḩ) is a village in Nasrabad Rural District (Kermanshah Province), in the Central District of Qasr-e Shirin County, Kermanshah Province, Iran. At the 2006 census, its population was 85, in 22 families. The village is populated by Kurds.

References 

Populated places in Qasr-e Shirin County
Kurdish settlements in Kermanshah Province